In mathematics, a homoclinic orbit is a trajectory of a flow of a dynamical system which joins a saddle equilibrium point to itself. More precisely, a homoclinic orbit lies in the intersection of the stable manifold and the unstable manifold of an equilibrium.

Consider the continuous dynamical system described by the ODE

If the phase space has three or more dimensions, then it is important to consider the topology of the unstable manifold of the saddle point. The figures show two cases. First, when the stable manifold is topologically a cylinder, and secondly, when the unstable manifold is topologically a Möbius strip; in this case the homoclinic orbit is called twisted.

Discrete dynamical system 
Homoclinic orbits and homoclinic points are defined in the same way for iterated functions, as the intersection of the stable set and unstable set of some fixed point or periodic point of the system. 

We also have the notion of homoclinic orbit when considering discrete dynamical systems. In such a case, if  is a diffeomorphism of a manifold , we say that  is a homoclinic point if it has the same past and future - more specifically, if there exists a fixed (or periodic) point 
 such that

Properties 
The existence of one homoclinic point implies the existence of an infinite number of them.
This comes from its definition: the intersection of a stable and unstable set. Both sets are invariant by definition, which means that the forward iteration of the homoclinic point is both on the stable and unstable set. By iterating N times, the map approaches the equilibrium point by the stable set, but in every iteration it is on the unstable manifold too, which shows this property.

This property suggests that complicated dynamics arise by the existence of a homoclinic point. Indeed, Smale (1967) showed that these points leads to horseshoe map like dynamics, which is associated with chaos.

Symbolic dynamics 
By using the Markov partition, the long-time behaviour of a hyperbolic system can be studied using the techniques of symbolic dynamics. In this case, a homoclinic orbit has a particularly simple and clear representation. Suppose that  is a finite set of M symbols. The dynamics of a point x is then represented by a bi-infinite string of symbols 

A periodic point of the system is simply a recurring sequence of letters. A heteroclinic orbit is then the joining of two distinct periodic orbits. It may be written as

The notation  simply denotes the repetition of p an infinite number of times. Thus, a heteroclinic orbit can be understood as the transition from one periodic orbit to another. By contrast, a homoclinic orbit can be written as 

with the intermediate sequence  being non-empty, and, of course, not being p, as otherwise, the orbit would simply be .

See also 
 Heteroclinic orbit
 Homoclinic bifurcation

References 

 John Guckenheimer and Philip Holmes, Nonlinear Oscillations, Dynamical Systems, and Bifurcations of Vector Fields (Applied Mathematical Sciences Vol. 42), Springer

External links 
 Homoclinic orbits in Henon map with Java applets and comments

Dynamical systems